Lampung Sakti Football Club was an Indonesian football club based in Teluk Betung, Lampung and owned by PT Great Giant Pineapple Company (GGPC) Humas Jaya.

History 
Previously, Lampung Sakti named Persires Sukoharjo. Persires was change their name 7 times. At 1962, Persires based in rengat and use Persires Rengat as their club name. At the middle 2011, mergering with  Bali Devata FC and named Persires Bali Devata FC. Then they named Persires Banjarnegara after their move to Banjarnegara. At 2013, they move again to watubelah cirebon and change the name again to Persires Cirebon. At 2014, they move to Mashud Wisnusaputra Stadium, Kuningan with named Persires Kuningan FC. At 2015, they move to sukoharjo and change their name again.

Name 
 Persires Rengat (1962; lists of the major shareholder of the Indragiri Hulu Regency Government)
 Persires Bali Devata FC (2011–2012; merging with Bali Devata FC)
 Persires Banjarnegara (2013; home base at Banjarnegara)
 Persires Cirebon FC (2013; home base at Watubelah Stadium, Cirebon)
 Persires Kuningan FC (2014; home base at Mashud Wisnusaputra Stadium, Kuningan)
 Persires Sukoharjo (2015–2017; home base at Gelora Merdeka Jombor Stadium, Sukoharjo)
 Lampung Sakti FC (2017–2019)

Stadium 
In 2017 Liga 2 the club will use Sumpah Pemuda Stadium for their home matches.

References

External links 
 

Defunct football clubs in Indonesia
Association football clubs established in 2017
Association football clubs disestablished in 2019